Remote diagnostics is the act of diagnosing a given symptom, issue or problem from a distance. Instead of the subject being co-located with the person or system done diagnostics, with remote diagnostics the subjects can be separated by physical distance (e.g., Earth-Moon). Important information is exchanged either through wire or wireless.

When limiting to systems, a general accepted definition is:
"To improve reliability of vital or capital-intensive installations and reduce the maintenance costs by avoiding unplanned maintenance, by monitoring the condition of the system remotely."

Process elements for remote diagnostics
 Remotely monitor selected vital system parameters
 Analysis of data to detect trends
 Comparison with known or expected behavior data
 After detected performance degradation, predict the failure moment by extrapolation
 Order parts and/or plan maintenance, to be executed when really necessary, but in time to prevent a failure or stop

Typical uses
 Medical use (see Remote guidance)
 Formula One racecars
 Space (Apollo project and others)
 Telephone systems like a PABX

Reasons for use
 Limit local personnel to a minimum (Gemini, Apollo capsules: too tight to fit all technicians)
 Limit workload of local personnel
 Limit risks (exposure to dangerous environments)
 Central expertise (locally solve small problems, remotely/centralized solve complex problems by experts)
 Efficiency: reduce travel time to get expert and system or subject together

Remote diagnostics and maintenance 

Remote diagnostics and maintenance refers to both diagnoses of the fault or faults and taking corrective (maintenance) actions, like changing settings to improve performance or prevent problems like breakdown, wear and tear. RDM can replace manpower at location by experts on a central location, in order to save manpower or prevent hazardous situations (space for instance). Increasing globalisation and more and more complicated machinery and software, also creates the wish to remote engineering, so travel over growing distances of experienced and expensive engineering personnel is limited.

See also 
 Real-time computing

Real-time technology

References

Motor vehicle maintenance